Hiram Berry may refer to:

 Hiram Gregory Berry (1824–1863), American politician and general -- also Abraham Lincoln's Brother-in-law. 
 Hiram Berry (Glee), fictional character